Zoanthidae is a family of cnidarians.

Genera include:
 Acrozoanthus Saville-Kent, 1893
 Isaurus Gray, 1828
 Zoanthus Cuvier, 1800

References

 
Brachycnemina
Cnidarian families